Ila Bêka and Louise Lemoine are two architectural artists and filmmakers. Their films focus on the relationship of people and design, emphasising the presence of everyday life within some of the most iconic architectural projects of recent decades. Bêka's and Lemoine's complete work (16 films) has been acquired in 2016 by MoMA, Museum of Modern Art in New York, and is now part of its permanent collection.

Filmography 
 2008: Koolhaas Houselife (58min) - Documentary - Official Selection at 8th Venice Biennale of Architecture
 2010: "Inside Piano": The Submarine (39min), "The little Beaubourg (26min), "The power of silence (34min)  - 3 Documentaries
 2013: Pomerol, Herzog & de Meuron (51min) - Documentary
 2013: Xmas Meier (51min) - Documentary
 2013: Gehry's Vertigo, (48min) - Documentary - Official Selection at 10th Venice Biennale of Architecture (extract)
 2013: Living Architectures Zip (60min) - Documentary - Best Film at ArchFilmLund Festival, Sweden
 2013: 25bis (46min) - Documentary
 2014: La Maddalena (12min) - Video installation - Official Selection at 14th Venice Biennale of Architecture
 2014: La Maddalena Chair (25min) - Video installation - Official Selection at 14th Venice Biennale of Architecture
 2014: 24 heures sur place (90min) - Documentary - Special Jury Prize at 32nd Torino Film Festival
 2014: L'expérience du vide (45min) - Documentary
 2014: Barbicania (90min) - Documentary - Art project commissioned by Barbican Centre
 2015: The Infinite Happiness (85min) - Documentary
 2015: Spiriti (15x3min circa)- Video installation- Art project commissioned by Fondazione Prada, Milano
 2016: Voyage autour de la Lune (75min) - Documentary
 2016: Selling Dreams (25min + 12min) - Video installation - Official Selection Oslo Triennale
2017: Moriyama-San (63min) - Documentary - Best Prize at Architecture Film Festival London
2019: Butohouse (34min) - Documentary - International Premiere at DocAviv Film Festival.
2017-2020: Homo Urbanus (10 x 55min) - Video installation - Official Selection Seoul Biennale and Agora Biennale in Bordeaux
2020: Tokyo Ride (90min) - Documentary - Artistic Vision Award, Depth of Field Competition - Best Prize - Docaviv Film Festival, 2020
2021: Oslavia, The Cave of the Past Future (17min) - Video installation - World premiere at MAXXI Museum in Rome

Teaching 

 In 2019-2022 he taught the Diploma Unit "Homo Urbanus, Laboratory for Sensitive Observers" at AA School, Architectural Association School of Architecture in London.[1]
 In 2019-2021 he taught the course "Filming Architecture" at the AAM, the Accademia di Architettura di Mendrisio, in Switzerland.[2]
 In 2021 he taught The Berlage Theory Master Class "A Journey Round My Room" at The Berlage Center for Advanced Studies in Architecture and Urban Design, in Delft.[3]
 In 2020 he taught the course "MAXXI Architecture Film Summer School" at MAXXI The National Museum of XXI Century Arts, Rome, IT.[4]
 In 2019-2020 he taught the course "Voyage autour de ma chambre" at HEAD, Haute École d'art et de design de Genève.
 In 2017 he taught the course "The Emotion of Space" at Domaine de Boisbuchet in Lessac, France.
 In 2016 and 2015 he taught the course "Filming Architecture" with Marco Müller and Louise Lemoine at the AAM, the Accademia di Architettura di Mendrisio, in Switzerland.
 In 2014 and 2013 he taught the course "Cinema & Architecture" at GSAPP Columbia University for the New York/Paris program.

Recognition 
 MoMA, Museum of Modern Art in New York: The complete work (16 films) of Ila Bêka and Louise Lemoine has been acquired for the permanent collection.
 CNAP, Centre National des Arts Plastiques: "Koolhaas Houselife" and "La Maddalena" have been acquired for the permanent collection.
 FRAC Centre, Orléans: "Butohouse", "Moriyama-San", "The Infinite Happiness", "Selling Dreams", "Gehry's Vertigo" have been acquired for the permanent collection.
 Awarded by Metropolis (architecture magazine) as Game Changer 2015.
Artists in residence at Villa Kujoyama in Kyoto, Japan, 2018.
Rome Prize Italian Fellow at American Academy in Rome (Ila Bêka), Italy, 2018.
 Selected by Icon Design as one of the 100 most talented personalities in the world in 2017.
 Presented by the Metropolitan Museum of Art as one of the “Most exciting and critical design project of the year 2016”.
 Prix d'Honneur FILAF 2020, Festival International du Livre d’Art et du Film, Perpignan, 2020.

Published Dvd-Books 
 Beka & Lemoine, 2016, DVD-Box Set Volume 1 & 2. 0701197948082
 The Infinite Happiness, 2016, DVD. 0701197948105
 Koolhaas Houselife, 2016, DVD. 0701197948112
 Koolhaas Houselife, 2008, .
 Koolhaas Houselife, 2013, .
 Pomerol, Herzog & de Meuron, 2013, .
 Xmas Meier, 2013, .
 Gehry's Vertigo, 2013, .
 Inside Piano, 2013, .
 Living Architectures, 2013, .

References 

Filmmaking duos